A person who works for daily wages is termed as *kuli* in indian language telugu may refer to:

Places

Ghana
 Kuli, Ghana, a village in Tolon District in the Northern Region of Ghana

Iran
 Kuli Alikhan, a village in Khuzestan Province
 Kuli Alireza, a village in Khuzestan Province
 Kuli Bakhtiari, a village in Khuzestan Province
 Kuli Darreh
 Kuli Khoda Karam, a village in Khuzestan Province
 Kuli Mohammad Hoseyn, a village in Khuzestan Province
 Kuli Rostam, a village in Khuzestan Province
 Kuli Seran
 Kuli, West Azerbaijan, a village in West Azerbaijan Province

North Macedonia 
 Markovi Kuli

Norway
 Kuli, Norway, a small island in Smøla Municipality in Møre og Romsdal county

Russia
 Kuli, Akushinsky District, Republic of Dagestan
 Kuli, Kulinsky District, Republic of Dagestan

Other uses
 Nickname of Ali Kuli Khan Khattak (20th century), former chief of military intelligence of the Pakistan Army
 Bekim Kuli (born 1982), Albanian football striker
 Coolie, a contemporary racial slur for people of Asian descent; however, in many cultures it is a neutral term for a hard-laborer
 The Kuli stone or Kulisteinen, a runestone in Norway
 An umbrella term used by the Dagbamba of West Africa for funerals and the traditional rituals around it

See also
 Coolie (disambiguation)
 Quli (disambiguation)